Sabang Sajanikanta Mahavidyalaya, also known as Sabang College, is a college situated at Lutunia, Sabang, in Paschim Medinipur district, West Bengal, India. It was established in 1970. It offers undergraduate courses in arts, commerce and sciences. It is affiliated to  Vidyasagar University.

History
Sabang Sajanikanta Mahavidyalaya was established in 1970 and foundation stone of this college was laid by Sri Sri Swarupananda Paramahansa Deva.  The college owes its origin to princely donation from Late Sajanikanta Giri. At the time of inception, this college was affiliated to University of Calcutta. Presently, it is affiliated to Vidyasagar University

Departments

Sciences
Chemistry
Physics
Mathematics
Botany
Zoology
Physiology

Arts and Commerce

Bengali
English
Sanskrit
History
Political Science
Philosophy
Education
Economics
Physical Education
Commerce

Accreditation
The college is recognized by the University Grants Commission (UGC).

See also

References

External links
 Sabang Sajanikanta Mahavidyalaya

Universities and colleges in Paschim Medinipur district
Colleges affiliated to Vidyasagar University
Educational institutions established in 1970
1970 establishments in West Bengal